Tunki is a town in Sangrampur tehsil of Buldhana district, Maharashtra State, India.

Geography
It is located at foothill of Satpuda Range and located on MH State Highway 173 and MH State Highway 194

Demographics
 India census, Tunki had a population of 10,000.

Description 

The post office Postal Index Number (PIN code) is 444204 and is served by Sonala post offices. Near this village, a wide range of Satpuda hills are present. Also, Ambabarva wildlife sanctuary is the big attraction of tourists. The peoples from surrounding villages come at Tunki because of many reasons. Trunki is one of the places where people get all the necessary foodstuffs. Thousands of hector of land is cultivated for the crop like orange farms, banana farms, maize, and soyabean. But the most cultivated crop is cotton. People from this village rarely cultivate mango trees. One most important thing is that people from this village celebrate every festival with full of happiness and courage. One unknown river originated from Satpura hills goes from this village. I Vivek Nimbolkar often went there. Because it is one of the biggest attractions of this village. Along with that Tunki village full of natures beauty. People help each other.

Some of nearby villages are Shivani, Wasali, Chichari, Saykhed, Alewadi, Ladnapur, Bawanbir, Sagoda, Palsoda, Warkhed, Dhamangaon, Palsi Zasi, Kolad, Wadgaon Pr Adgaon, Warwat Bakal, Jamod, Warkhed, Saundala, Raikhed, Danapur,

Nearby town are Sonala, Akot, Sangrampur, Jalgaon Jamod, Telhara, Shegaon
.

Education 
Following are the schools and colleges in Tunki:-

1) Marathi Purv Madhymik School, Tunki

This school has to teach up to 7th class. After that students go to Aadiwasi Madhyamik Vidhyalay Tunki school.

2) Aadiwasi Madhymik Vidhyalay, Tunki 

This college has a high education also. Students can educate here up to 12th. In 10+1&2, Art stream is also present in this school. And one important thing is that the whole education is completely free. Also they provide books up to 8th standard.

References

Villages in Buldhana district